The 2023 West Coast Conference baseball tournament will be held from May 24 through 27 at a new venue: Las Vegas Ballpark in Summerlin South, Nevada. It is the first of four baseball tournaments the WCC has scheduled for the venue.  The six team tournament winner will earn the league's automatic bid to the 2023 NCAA Division I baseball tournament.

The tournament will use the 6-team format adapted in 2022 where 3 plays 6 and 4 plays 5 in first day elimination games. 

Additionally this is the final season BYU will participate in the WCC as they will join the Big 12 Conference for the 2024 season.

Seeding
The top six finishers from the regular season will be seeded one through six based on conference winning percentage.  Teams 1 and 2 will have a bye into the double elimination bracket while 3 plays 6 and 4 plays 5 in a single elimination first round.

Tiebreakers:
To be filled in upon completion of the season.

Results

Play-in round

Double-elimination round

Schedule
All matches will be streamed on WCC Network. Additional details will be filled-in once the tournament bracket is finalized.

References

West Coast Conference Baseball Championship
Tournament
West Coast Conference baseball tournament
Sports competitions in the Las Vegas Valley
College baseball tournaments in Nevada